Irreligion, which may include deism, agnosticism, ignosticism, anti-religion, atheism, skepticism, ietsism, spiritual but not religious, freethought, anti-theism, apatheism, non-belief, pandeism, secular humanism, non-religious theism, pantheism, panentheism, and New age, varies in the countries around the world. According to reports from the Worldwide Independent Network/Gallup International Association's (WIN/GIA) four global polls: in 2005, 77% were a religious person and 4% were "convinced atheists"; in 2012, 23% were not a religious person and 13% were "convinced atheists"; in 2015, 22% were not a religious person and 11% were "convinced atheists"; and in 2017, 25% were not a religious person and 9% were "convinced atheists". According to the Pew Research Centre in 2012, 16% of the world is "religiously unaffiliated", which "include atheists, agnostics and people who do not identify with any particular religion in surveys"; of that overall category, many may still hold some religious beliefs and some engage in religious practices as well.

According to sociologist Phil Zuckerman, broad estimates of those who have an absence of belief in a god range from 500 to 750 million people worldwide. According to sociologists Ariela Keysar and Juhem Navarro-Rivera's review of numerous global studies on atheism, there are 450 to 500 million positive atheists and agnostics worldwide (7% of the world's population) with China alone accounting for 200 million of that demographic. Relative to its own populations, Zuckerman ranks the top 5 countries with the highest possible ranges of agnostics  and atheists: Sweden (46-85%), Vietnam (81%), Denmark (43-80%), Norway (31-72%), and Japan (64-65%).

Differences in questions asked in polls 
Each poll uses different questions and methods:-
 The Worldwide Independent Network/Gallup International Association (WIN/GIA) poll asked "Irrespective of whether you attend a place of worship or not, would you say that you are a religious person, not a religious person or a convinced atheist?" 
 Dentsu Communication Institute provides data for respondents who stated that they have "no religion".
 Phil Zuckerman uses only the number of people who describe themselves as atheists and agnostics.
The numbers come from different years, and might not be accurate for countries with governments that require or urge religion or secularism.

Countries and regions 
The Pew Research Centre data in the table below reflects "religiously unaffiliated" which "include atheists, agnostics and people who do not identify with any particular religion in surveys".

The WIN-Gallup International Association (WIN/GIA) poll results below are the totals for "not a religious person" and "a convinced atheist" combined.

Keysar et al. have advised caution with WIN/Gallup International figures since more extensive surveys which have used the same wording for decades and have bigger sample sizes, have consistently reached lower figures than the numbers in the table below. For example, the WIN/GIA numbers from China were overestimated which in turn inflated global totals.

The Zuckerman data on the table below only reflect the number of people who have an absence of belief in a deity only (atheists, agnostics). Does not include the broader number of people who do not identify with a religion such as deists, spiritual but not religious, pantheists, New Age spiritualism, etc.

By population

The Pew Research Centre in the table below reflects "religiously unaffiliated" which "include atheists, agnostics and people who do not identify with any particular religion in surveys".

The Zuckerman data on the table below only reflect the number of people who have an absence of belief in a deity only (atheists, agnostics). Does not include the broader number of people who do not identify with a religion such as deists, spiritual but not religious, pantheists, New Age spiritualism, etc.

See also 
 Importance of religion by country
 List of religious populations

References

External links

 
Lists by country